E. M. Backus Lodge, also known as Camp Toxaway, The Cold Mountain Lodge and Canaan Land Christian Retreat , is a historic hunting lodge and national historic district located near Lake Toxaway, Jackson County and Transylvania County, North Carolina. The lodge was built about 1903, and is a 2-story, double-pile house of chestnut logs.  The lodge contains eight rooms on two floors, each grouped around a central hall. Also on the property are the contributing log stable (1908, 1922), caretaker's cottage (1908, 1922), guest cottage (c. 1922), barn (c. 1922), and Davis Cottage (c. 1922).  The site was the former hunting lodge of Thomas Edison, Henry Ford and Harvey Firestone. The camp became an exclusive girls' camp, Camp Toxaway, in 1922, and a religious and educational retreat in 1955 known as Canaan Land. The estate was bought by George and Nancy Corbett of Florida in 1986 and is still operated by the Corbett family.

It was listed on the National Register of Historic Places in 1988.

References

External links
Canaan Land Christian Retreat

Log houses in the United States
Houses on the National Register of Historic Places in North Carolina
Historic districts on the National Register of Historic Places in North Carolina
Rustic architecture in North Carolina
Houses completed in 1908
Buildings and structures in Jackson County, North Carolina
National Register of Historic Places in Jackson County, North Carolina
Buildings and structures in Transylvania County, North Carolina
National Register of Historic Places in Transylvania County, North Carolina
Log buildings and structures on the National Register of Historic Places in North Carolina
1908 establishments in North Carolina